Konkan Railway Corporation Limited (KRCL) is an Indian public sector undertaking which operates Konkan Railway and also undertakes other railway-related projects. It is wholly-owned by the Government of India under the administrative control of the Ministry of Railways and headquartered at CBD Belapur in Navi Mumbai. The railway (railroad) route of KRCL covers the coastal districts of Maharashtra, Goa and Karnataka states of India.

The company started its full operations of trains on 26 January 1998. The first passenger train which ran on Konkan railway tracks on 20 March 1993 between Udupi and Mangalore. Konkan Railway Corporation is at the forefront of research and development of new technologies and concepts for Indian railways. During its initial years of operations in the mountainous Konkan region, a spate of accidents prompted Konkan Railway to investigate new technologies. The anti-collision devices, the Sky Bus and RORO are a few of Konkan Railway's innovations.

RORO 
RORO means Roll-on/roll-off, where loaded trucks are directly carried by railway wagons to their destination. The first ever RO-RO service in India was run by Konkan Railway. Konkan Railway passes through tough terrains of India. There is NH-66 passing through same route. Truck drivers find it extremely difficult to drive loaded trucks through ghats, undulating surfaces, narrow roads and poor road and weather conditions. The KRC came with concept of RORO, where loaded trucks are moved on wagons and are travelled by train. This has helped in saving fuel, decrease in wear and tear of lorries (trucks), relief to drivers of driving in extreme conditions, and faster arrival of the trucks to destination. This also helps decrease road congestion and pollution. This concept has been beneficial for both truck operators and KRCL.

Railway stations in Konkan Railway route 
This is the partial list of railway stations coming under the jurisdiction of Konkan Railway Corporation Limited. The list of railway (railroad) stations is from the South to the North direction. Thokur, Surathkal railway station, Mulki, Padubidre, Nandikoor, Innanje, Udupi, Barkur, Kundapura, Senapura, Bijoor, Byndoor, Shiroor, Bhatkal, Chitrapur, Murudeshwar, Manki, Honnavara, Kumta, Gokarna Road, Ankola, Harawada, Karwar, Asnoti, Lolem, Cancona, Balli, Madgaon, Suravali, Majorda, Verna, Karmali, Thivim, Pernem, Madure, Sawantwadi Road, Zarap, Kudal, Sindudurg, Kankavali, Nandgaon Road, Vaibhavwadi Road, Kharepatan, Rajapur Road, Saundal, Vilavade, Veravali, Adavali, Nivasar, Ratnagiri, Bhoke, Ukshi, Sangameshwar, Kadavi, Aravali, Savrada, Kamathe, Chiplun, Anjani, Khed, Kalambani Budruk, Diwankhawti, Vinhere, Karanjadi, Sape Wamne, Veer, Goregaon Road, Mangaon, Indapur and Kolad.  Most of the long distance trains carrying passengers have a stop or halt in at least one place of each district of states through which particular train runs.

Other Projects 

Konkan Railway Corporation Limited(KRCL) executes other projects for  the government of India and state governments. It is one of the contractor for Udampur- Sringar- Baramulla Rail link Project (USBRL) assigned to built a tunnel in that project. KRCL has been selected to prepare Detailed Project Report(DPR) by Kerala state government to  built a tunnel to ease traffic congestion on Wayanad- Kozhikode road. 

Konkan Railways has played a major role in Construction & Design of Chenab Bridge.

Konkan Railway Corporation Limited(KRCL) completed doubling of tracks from Roha railway station to Veer railway station and Matsyagandha Express train(02619) became first train to travel in down ( LTT to Mangaluru) route of doubled track from Roha to Veer on 30 August 19.35 hours.

See also 

 Konkan Railway
 Intermodal flatcar
 Intermodal freight transport
 Modalohr
 Piggy-back
 Roadrailer
 Rolling highway

References

External links 
 
 Indian Railways
 Raksha Kavacha
 ACD
 Indian Railways Information

Railway companies of India
Companies based in Mumbai
Indian companies established in 1990
Railway companies established in 1990
1990 establishments in Maharashtra